A list by date of birth of historically recognized American fine artists known for the creation of artworks that are primarily visual in nature, including traditional media such as painting, sculpture, photography, and printmaking, as well as more recent genres, including installation art, performance art, body art, conceptual art, video art, and digital art.

For ease of use the list has been subdivided, and can be found at:
List of American artists before 1900 
List of American artists 1900 and after

See also 

American Art
Native American artists
African American art
Sculpture of the United States
Feminist Art Movement
Hudson River School
Luminism
American Impressionism
Ashcan School
Precisionism
American scene painting
Regionalism
WPA Federal Art Project
Northwest School
Abstract Expressionism
Pop Art
Happenings
Fluxus
Intermedia
Hard-edge painting
Minimalism
Post-painterly Abstraction 
Color Field Painting
Post-Minimalism
Process Art
Site-specific art
Earth Art
Lyrical Abstraction
Photorealism
Conceptual Art
Postmodernism
Digital Art